Fertile Township is a township in Walsh County, North Dakota, United States. 51.6% (127) of the population are male, and the other 48.4% (119) are female.

References

See also
Walsh County, North Dakota

Townships in North Dakota
Townships in Walsh County, North Dakota